(Spanish),  (Catalan),  (Italian), or  (Portuguese) is a basic preparation in Mediterranean,  Latin American, Spanish, Italian and Portuguese cooking. It typically consists of aromatic ingredients cut into small pieces and sautéed or braised in cooking oil.

In modern Spanish cuisine,  consists of garlic, onion and peppers cooked in olive oil, and optionally tomatoes or carrots.

Mediterranean
In  Mediterranean cuisine, olive oil is heavily emphasized as the third critical component in the base along with tomatoes and onions. Garlic is optional, as it is not considered an integral part of the standard  recipe. Tomatoes and peppers, both New World vegetables, were not cultivated in Europe until the 1540s, and are a later addition.

It is used as the base for many pasta sauces, such as bolognese sauce, but occasionally it can be used as the base of other dishes, such as sauteed vegetables. For this reason, it is a fundamental component in Italian cuisine. It may also contain garlic, shallot, or leek.

In Greek cuisine, the term  refers to a specific dish native to, and almost exclusively to be found on, the island of Corfu.  is a veal steak slow-cooked in a white wine, garlic, and herb sauce, and is usually served with rice.

Latin America
In Brazilian cuisine, the verb  also encompasses dishes that are fried in vegetable oil before being boiled or steamed, even when the actual fried seasoning is not there. Similarly, rice that has been toasted in vegetable oil before it is boiled is technically .

In Cuban cuisine,  is prepared in a similar fashion, but the main components are Spanish onions, garlic, and green or red bell peppers.  is also often used instead of or in addition to bell peppers. Other secondary components include tomato sauce, dry white wine, cumin, bay leaf, and cilantro. (a kind of spicy, cured sausage),  (salt pork) and ham are added for specific recipes, such as beans.

In Dominican cuisine,  is also called , and is a liquid mixture containing vinegar, water, and sometimes tomato juice. A typical Dominican  is made up of very finely chopped green, red, and yellow bell peppers, red onions, garlic, ground oregano, apple cider vinegar, tomato paste, water, and cilantro. Ingredients vary and can change, for instance cubanelle peppers can substitute for bell peppers, celery can replace onions, and parsley or culantro can be used in place of cilantro.

In Ecuadorian cuisine,  is called , and it is made of Spanish onions, cubanelle peppers, fresh tomatoes, roasted garlic, cilantro, and ground toasted cumin.

In Peruvian cuisine, sofrito is called aderezo, and it is made of red onion, garlic, one or more chili paste (ají), according to recipe, salt and black pepper.  Aderezo could also incorporate tomato or achiote.  Some regional variation is known, as the inclusion of loche squash in north coastal Peru.

In Haitian cuisine, the flavor base of most dishes is epis, a combination sauce made from cooked peppers, garlic, and herbs, particularly green onions, thyme, and parsley. It is also used as a basic condiment for rice and beans and is also used in stews and soups.

In some Caribbean cuisine,  is seasoned lard and functions as a base for many traditional dishes, but prepared differently from the method described above. Lard (acquired from rendering pork fat) is strained, and annatto seeds are added to colour it yellow, and later strained out. To the colored lard is added a ground mixture of cured ham, bell pepper, chile pepper, and onion; after this, mashed coriander leaves (cilantro) and oregano leaves are added. Garlic cloves are added in a tea ball, and the sauce is simmered for half an hour. The term also refers to a number of related sauces and seasonings in the Caribbean and Central and Latin America.

Asia
In Filipino cuisine,  is a culinary term that refers to a base of garlic, onions, and tomatoes sautéed together with cooking oil. It is essentially similar to the Spanish .

See also

 Tempering (spices)
 
 Sauce
 Salsa
 Holy trinity
 Sofrito (stew)
 Epis

References

Further reading
Roden, Claudia, A New Book of Middle Eastern Food: London 1986 
Roden, Claudia, The Book of Jewish Food: New York 1997, London 1999

External links 
 
 

Food ingredients
Tomato sauces
Caribbean cuisine
Colombian cuisine
Cuban cuisine
Dominican Republic cuisine
Ecuadorian cuisine
Philippine cuisine
Cuisine of the Ionian Islands
Italian cuisine
Latin American cuisine
Mexican cuisine
Portuguese cuisine
Puerto Rican cuisine
Sephardi Jewish cuisine
Spanish cuisine